Darian Bernard Durant (born August 19, 1982) is a former professional Canadian football quarterback. He played college football at the University of North Carolina. By the end of his college career, he held school records for completion percentage, touchdowns, passing yards, total offense and completions. Durant was signed as a free agent by the Saskatchewan Roughriders in 2006, and became the club's full-time starting quarterback in 2009. He was named a CFL West Division All-Star in 2009 and 2013. Durant was the starting quarterback when the Saskatchewan Roughriders won the 101st Grey Cup in 2013 on their home field. Durant also played for the Montreal Alouettes in 2017. His brother Justin played in the National Football League as a linebacker.

Early life
Durant was born on August 19, 1982, in Florence, South Carolina to Betty and Israel Durant. He has three brothers and a sister. His younger brother, Justin, played for the NFL's Dallas Cowboys, and his older brother, Keyshawn, was a quarterback at South Carolina State.

Amateur football

High school
Durant attended high school at Wilson High School in Florence, South Carolina. During his senior year of high school, he led the team to South Carolina's 4-A state semi-finals. Durant set a school record with 2,446 passing yards and tied his own record with 25 touchdown passes, which was set during his sophomore season. He was named a Super Prep All-America, Honorable Mention All-America by USA Today and Prep Star All-Region selection. He also played in the South Carolina All-Star game, where he completed 9 of his 11 passing attempts for 215 yards.

College
Durant signed a letter of intent to play college football at the University of North Carolina in 2000. In 2001, during his first NCAA season, Durant established school freshman records with 17 touchdown passes, 142 completions, 1843 passing yards and 1971 yards of total offense. His freshman records for passing yards and completions were broken in 2007 by T. J. Yates. During his freshman season, Durant was named Atlantic Coast Conference (ACC) Rookie of the Week five times. He finished second overall in ACC Rookie of the Year voting to Florida State quarterback Chris Rix. As a freshman, Durant split time with Ronald Curry, helping the team to a victory in the 2001 Peach Bowl against Auburn. He was awarded the Jeffrey Cowell Memorial Award as the team's top freshman.

After his college career, Durant was one of the most accomplished athletes in the school's history. He held 51 offensive records at the school. During his sophomore season, Durant set the school's single-game record for passing yards with 417 during a victory against Arizona State. In his junior year, he set single-season records with 389 passing attempts, 234 completions and 2,551 passing yards. Durant had set UNC records with 1,159 passing attempts, 701 completions, 68 passing touchdowns, 8,755 passing yards and 9,630 yards of total offense. While playing football at the University of North Carolina, Durant completed a degree in African-American studies.

Professional football

Baltimore Ravens
Durant was undrafted in the 2005 NFL Draft, but signed a free agent contract with the Baltimore Ravens and attended their training camp. He was briefly on the team's practice squad, but was cut during the 2005 season because of concerns about his size.

Saskatchewan Roughriders
Durant was placed on the Ottawa Renegades negotiation list in 2006, by future Saskatchewan Roughriders general manager Eric Tillman. After the Renegades folded, his rights were obtained by the Hamilton Tiger-Cats and later dealt to the Roughriders in a trade that included Corey Holmes. Durant signed with the team on May 11, 2006. During the 2006 season, he served as the team's backup quarterback for eight games, completing a single pass for 14 yards and recording a single rushing attempt for 20 yards in a game against Hamilton. Durant was on the team's practice roster for the remaining ten games.

During the 2007 season, Durant spent the entire season on the active roster, and was available for all of the Roughrider regular season and playoff games, but did not see any game action while serving as the team's third-string quarterback. Durant was on the sidelines as starting quarterback Kerry Joseph led Roughriders to a victory over the Winnipeg Blue Bombers in the Grey Cup.

Joseph was traded to the Toronto Argonauts prior to the 2008 season, leaving the club without an incumbent quarterback. During the season, the Roughriders tried four different starting quarterbacks including Durant, Steven Jyles, Michael Bishop and Marcus Crandell. Durant started four games for the Riders during the season, and played in four others. He had seven passing touchdowns, and one rushing touchdown during the season. Crandell was released during the season and Bishop was also released shortly after the Roughriders season was finished. In January 2009, Durant signed a new contract with the Roughriders rather than becoming a free agent.

Durant entered the 2009 season as the club's starting quarterback, but head coach Ken Miller gave backup Jyles significant playing time as well. Durant made the most of his opportunity, becoming the first Roughrider quarterback to start all 18 games since Kent Austin, who last played for the club in 1993. Durant's consistency on the field was one of the reasons he earned the Roughriders' starting quarterback position, along with his ability to run for yards when his pass protection breaks down. Durant was named the Roughriders nominee for CFL Most Outstanding Player, and was selected a West Division All-Star at quarterback. He was also named the Roughriders' Wireless Age Most Popular Player. Durant led the Roughriders to the Grey Cup, where they were defeated by the Montreal Alouettes on a last second field goal. He finished the 2009 season with 4,348 passing yards and 501 rushing yards. Durant threw 24 touchdown passes during the season and also had 21 interceptions, leading the CFL. Heading into the 2010 season, Durant wanted to cut down on his interceptions, although he tried to be optimistic, "I throw 21 picks last year and I guarantee every guy with better stats than me wishes they were in the Grey Cup."

In a Grey Cup rematch to kick off the 2010 CFL season, Durant and the Roughriders staged a second half comeback to defeat the Alouettes in overtime. Durant threw five touchdown passes and picked up 478 passing yards during the game. For his efforts, he was named the CFL's Offensive Player of the Week. At the halfway point of the season, Durant had thrown 11 touchdown passes and 14 interceptions, while rushing for another five touchdowns. The CFL named Durant Offensive Player of the Month for September after a month where he passed for 1387 yards and five touchdowns. After Game 17 versus the BC Lions, Durant became only the second Roughrider quarterback to throw for over 5,000 yards in a season, with the first being former head coach Kent Austin. Durant was selected as the Roughriders' nominee for the CFL Most Outstanding Player Award.

The 2011 campaign was a let down year not only for Durant but also for the Roughriders as a whole. The Riders stumbled out of the gate losing seven of their first eight games. Durant's production fell significantly through the course of the season. Near the end of the season Durant was playing with a broken bone in his foot, which ultimately led to him missing the last two games of the regular season. The Riders would finish the year with only 5 wins and 13 losses, placing them in last place in the league. Despite the reduced production in 2011 on April 27, 2012, the Riders extended his contract through the 2014 CFL season.

The 2013 season was arguably the best season of Durant's career. He set career highs in touchdowns, with 31, while limiting his interceptions to only 12. He began the year having attempted 212 consecutive pass attempts without being intercepted joining Dave Dickenson and later Ricky Ray as the only quarterback in CFL history to start 7 consecutive games without throwing an interception. He also set a career-high for passer rating with 95.7 (excluding his 2006 season in which he only completed one pass). He led the Riders to an 11–7 record and home-field in the Western Semi-Finals against the BC Lions where several of his rushing plays won the game for the Riders. After beating Calgary in the Western Final, Durant led the Riders to their fourth Grey Cup championship on their home turf at Mosaic Stadium.

Durant was forced out of the 2015 season due to injury when he suffered a ruptured Achilles tendon in the Riders' first week game against the Winnipeg Blue Bombers. After rehabbing his Achilles tendon all off-season Durant returned as the Roughriders leading quarterback for the 2016 season. Early in the second quarter of the fourth week Durant left the game after BC defensive linemen Mic'hael Brooks fell into his leg on a passing play. He was taken into the Riders locker room and later appeared on the sidelines using crutches. Following the game the X-Rays revealed no structural damage, and Durant was considered day-to-day with an ankle sprain. Durant ending up only missing two weeks returning as the starting quarterback in Week 7. Durant was also rested for the final game of the season as the team was eliminated from playoff competition and wanted to see their other quarterbacks on roster (Brandon Bridge, Mitchell Gale, and G.J. Kinne) get some playing time. Following the conclusion of the regular season Durant expressed his disappointment that contract negotiations with the Roughriders had stalled. If no deal had been reached, Durant would have been a free-agent when the free agency period commenced on 14 February 2017. On January 5, 2017, the Riders made a new offer to Durant. The offer reportedly included a base salary of around $300,000, with performance incentives set to reach $400,000 in 2017.

Montreal Alouettes
After the Roughriders were unable to agree upon terms with Durant, his rights were traded to the Montreal Alouettes on January 13, 2017, for a fourth-round pick in the 2017 CFL Draft and a conditional second-round pick in the 2018 CFL Draft. On January 19, 2017, Durant and the Alouettes agreed to a three-year contract extension, preventing him from becoming a free-agent in mid-February. Durant struggled in his first season in Montreal. He started 15 games for the Als, but only managed to win three games. Durant was the second lowest rated starting quarterback according to the CFL's QUAR rating system. He threw more interceptions (16) than touchdowns (15) for the first time in his career, and his passer rating was the lowest it had been since his 2011 season. With Durant set to receive a roster bonus of $150,000 on January 15, 2018, the Alouettes sent Durant an ultimatum on January 10, 2018; informing him he needed to agree restructure his contract or he would be released. After failing to restructure his deal Durant was released by the Alouettes on January 15, 2018.

Winnipeg Blue Bombers
Durant agreed to terms on a one-year contract with the Winnipeg Blue Bombers on January 20, 2018. On May 11, 2018, Darian Durant announced his retirement from professional football. Durant's retirement surprised the Bombers who were expecting Durant to begin the season as the backup to Matt Nichols.

Statistics

Personal life
Durant has a tattoo on his left biceps reading "Against all odds – I'm gonna shine", which Durant believes explains his life. Durant's teammates and coaches describe him as a fierce competitor, who battles through injuries and illnesses. In conjunction with a local Ford dealer, and to commemorate the Roughriders' 100th anniversary, Durant lent his name to a limited edition Ford F-150 truck that was sold in Regina. The Durant limited edition featured a Durant license plate, his DD4 logo, Roughriders mud flaps and embossed head rests. There are only four of the trucks available, and $500 from the sale of each truck goes to support Durant's charity of choice, KidSport.

References

External links
 
 Montreal Alouettes bio
 Saskatchewan Roughriders bio

1982 births
Living people
African-American players of American football
African-American players of Canadian football
American football quarterbacks
Canadian football quarterbacks
Baltimore Ravens players
Montreal Alouettes players
North Carolina Tar Heels football players
Saskatchewan Roughriders players
Sportspeople from Florence, South Carolina
Players of American football from South Carolina
21st-century African-American sportspeople
20th-century African-American people